Debra Whitman is a fictional character appearing in American comic books published by Marvel Comics. Introduced in The Amazing Spider-Man #196 (Sept 1979), she served as a brief love interest for Peter Parker in the Spectacular Spider-Man and The Amazing Spider-Man comic titles in the late 1970s and early 1980s. She is also one of the first characters to determine that Peter was Spider-Man, although she was later convinced she was delusional.

The character has appeared in Spider-Man media adaptations, most notably in Spider-Man: The Animated Series.

Fictional character biography
Debra Whitman was a secretary in the biophysics department of Empire State University. While there, she met Peter and they started dating. However, things kept coming up in his secret life as Spider-Man and he kept giving her excuses to get out of the date. Because of Peter's rejections, she started to date Biff Rifkin for emotional support, but her infatuation with Peter did nothing but grow.

Debra also suffered from a mental instability that led her to idealize people and invert values. With Peter it grew further into her hallucinating that he was Spider-Man. When she told her psychiatrist, Dr. Baily Kuklin, about her hallucinations, he asked Peter to wear the Spider-Man suit to give her a shocking confrontation with reality to get her out of the hallucination. Peter refused, and indicated Biff Rifkin as a more reliable source of information. However, Biff already knew Debra when she was married to Mark Whitman. One day he asked her about her black eye and she gave evasive answers. That night he went to their house and saw Mark beating her. He rescued her and took her to the hospital, but she insisted Mark was a kind and gentle husband, locked in denial. Peter then wore the suit and told her he was Spider-Man. The shock made her come to her senses and decided to leave New York to get a divorce.
During the superhero "Civil War", Peter reveals his identity as Spider-Man to the world.  Thereafter, Debra is seen on the phone speaking to her co-writer about her new book, entitled "TWO FACED: How Spider-Man Ruined My Life".  She seems discouraged about the title and tone of the book, but is committed to a book signing later in the day. Enraged, she then hurls items around the room to get out her anger before the signing.  At the book signing, Spider-Man and the newly released Vulture are both seen planning to crash.

After Spider-Man defeats the Vulture, Debra reveals to Betty Brant the editors had forced her to exaggerate the mental damage that Peter had "done" to her in order to make for a better book. Debra's mother had been sick and the medical bills were far more than she could pay for, so when the Daily Bugle dug up all of Peter Parker's past relationships to get dirt on him, she jumped on the chance to write the book. Betty talked Debra into telling the truth to the Daily Globe, confidentially.

In order to save the life of May Parker (who was near death with no prospect of recovery), Peter and his wife Mary Jane Watson agree to allow the demon Mephisto to alter history. In the new timeline, Peter and Mary Jane were never married, and his identity as Spider-Man was forgotten. Consequently, Debra's knowledge of Peter's identity (beyond her suspicions while the two were dating) is erased from history as well.

In other media

Television

 Debra Whitman appeared in Spider-Man, voiced by Liz Georges. This version of the character is portrayed as a scientific genius and a love interest for Flash Thompson, while sharing a friendly rivalry with Peter Parker. She also showed interest in Michael Morbius prior to Flash. Debra plays a minor supporting role in the series, with one episode seeing her temporarily fall victim to the Vulture and another seeing her being rejected by Morbius and developing a crush on Flash. After learning Morbius became a pseudo-vampire, Debra attempted to make a cure for him, but her failure led to her becoming a party girl until Flash stepped in and reminded her of who she really is. She eventually returned to her original lifestyle and maintained her relationship with Flash.
 Debra Whitman appeared in The Spectacular Spider-Man, in a non-speaking role. This version is depicted as Miles Warren's African-American secretary. She is older than her comic book counterpart and therefore has no romantic interest in Peter. The show's original depiction of Gwen Stacy as a nerdy girl with glasses was also inspired by Debra in the comics.

References

External links
A profile of Debra Whitman, the 1970s supporting character
Debra's Profile at Spiderfan.org
The Return of Debra Whitman at Marvel.com

Fictional characters from New York City
Fictional secretaries
Comics characters introduced in 1979
Characters created by Al Milgrom
Characters created by Marv Wolfman
Spider-Man characters
Marvel Comics female characters